The 2006 PFF National League (now known as PFF League) was the 3rd season of PFF League, second tier of Pakistan Football Federation. The season started on 24 July 2006 concluded on 2 August 2006.

Teams

Promotion and relegation

Teams relegated from PPL 
Panther and Pakistan Public Work Department relegated from the 2005–06 Pakistan Premier League. However they didn't participated in the tournament.

Teams promoted from NCL 
PMC Club Athletico, Baloch Nushki and Bannu Red promoted from the 2006 National Club League.

Groups

Group 1

Group 2

Semi-final

Third-Place

Final

References 

Pakistan Football Federation League seasons
PFF
Pakistan